There are believed to be around 200 lost settlements in Norfolk, England. This includes places which have been abandoned as settlements due to a range of reasons and at different dates. Types of lost settlement include deserted medieval villages (DMVs), relocated or "shrunken" villages, those lost to coastal erosion and other settlements known to have been "lost" or significantly reduced in size over the centuries, including those evacuated during World War II due to the creation of the Stanford Training Area. There are estimated to be as many as 3,000 deserted medieval villages in England.

List of lost settlements
This list is of settlements which are known to have been lost and where the location can either be confirmed or is strongly suspected by the use of archaeological or documentary evidence. Settlements where there is less conclusive evidence as to their existence are recorded below this list. Grid references are given where known.

A

B

C

D

E

F

G

H

I

J

K

L

M

N

O

P

Q

R

S

T

V

W

List of possible lost settlements
In addition to confirmed or strongly suspected sites of lost villages, there are other locations which are believed to be the site of lost settlements. These are generally deserted medieval villages where there is some archaeological or other evidence to suggest that settlements existed but where identification is uncertain.

See also
List of lost settlements in the United Kingdom

References

External links
Deserted medieval villages and other abandoned communities in Britain

 
Norfolk
Lost
 
Archaeological sites in Norfolk
Lost settlements